Parichay Das (born Ravindra Nath Srivastava), is an Indian writer, essayist, poet and editor of contemporary Bhojpuri poetry. He is Professor and Head, Department of Hindi,  Nava Nalanda Mahavihara Deemed University. He writes in Bhojpuri and Hindi. He earned his Ph.D. from Gorakhpur University, Gorakhpur. He is former Secretary, Maithili-Bhojpuri Academy and ex-Secretary, Hindi Academy under Delhi Government. He has written/ edited/ text edited more than 30 books. He received Dwi-Vaageesh Samman award for "Srijan Evam Anuvaad" [Creative Writing and Translation] by the Bhartiya Anuvad Parishad [Translator's Association of India] in 2012. He received Bhojpuri Keerti Sammaan, Bharteey Dalit Sahitya Sammaan, Shyam Narayan Pandey Sammaan, Editor's Choice Award and Damodar Das Chaturvedi Bhasha-Sahitya Sammaan. He delivered a lecture on Bhojpuri in Kathmandu as representative of Kendriy Sahitya Akademi in 2012. He recited his poems in 'SAARC Literary Summit ' in Delhi in 2011. He is considered a unique personal essay writer in Indian Languages and path breaker poet in Bhojpuri.

Personal life
He was born in the village Rampur Devlaas in Mau district, Uttar Pradesh, India.
He was secretary, Hindi Academy, Delhi Government and Secretary, Maithili - Bhojpuri Academy of the Government of Delhi.
His wife Vandana Srivastava is a welknown and  trend setter artist in 'Bhojpuri Painting'. She developed Bhojpuri Painting from tradition to contemporary dimensions .

Career
Das has served as a secretary to Maithili–Bhojpuri Academy and Hindi Academy of the Delhi Government*He has also worked as an editor to the academies' magazines, Parichhan and Indra Prasth Bhaarti.

Edited an important creative literary critical book in Bhojpuri language on Bhikhari Thakur, a well-known actor and playwright in Bhojpuri.

Edited more than 25 cultural packages, including:
Manipuri Dance
Kuchipudi Dance
Musical Instrument of India (2 Volumes)
Architecture of India
Textile Designs (2 Volumes)
Traditional theatre in India

Edited/Text Edited Magazines
Indraprastha Bharti, a Hindi literary and cultural magazine published by Hindi Academy, Delhi
Srotasvini, a literary-cultural magazine published by CCRT, Govt of India
Saamskritiki, a literary-cultural magazine published by CCRT Govt of India
Pradnya, a socio-cultural, political magazine
Parichhan, a literary magazine published by Maithili-Bhojpuri Academy, Delhi

Some Discourses and Lectures/ Poetry Recitation -
Lecture on Globalisation and Literature/ Gorakhpur University [March 2014]
poetry Recitation / Sahitya Akademy /Delhi  [2012]
Chair, Bhartiya Kavita Utsav / Mathrubhumi foundation/ Delhi [2012]
Lecture on Indian novels / Kamla Nehru College, Delhi University [2012]

Lecture on Bhojpuri Literature and Language in kathmandu [Sahitya Akademy Representative][ 2012 ]
Poetry Recitation in SAARC literary festival, Delhi (2011)
Sahiya aur Samskriti ka Atm Saundarya (September, 2006, Indian Business Academy, Greater Noida)
Bhoomandalikaran aur samskriti-Sahitya (October, 2007, Indian Business Academy, Greater Noida)
Bhoomandalikaran, Vishwabandhutva aur Sahitya-Samskriti (December, 2007, Indian Business Academy, Greater Noida)
Literature and Culture (Kandriya Sachivalay Hindi Samiti)
50 other lectures in Delhi

Organising Events and Activities: Cultural Programmes
Organised above 100 Cultural Activities (literature, art, culture, drama, dance etc.)for Hindi and Maithili-Bhojpuri Academy, Delhi
Culture and Development
Hindi : Contemporary Scene

Bibliography
 Chaaruta
 Ek Naya Vinyaas
 Sansad Bhavan ki Chhat Per Khada Ho Ke
 Prithivi Se Ras Le Ke
 Yugpat Sameekaran Me
 Akanksha Se Adhik Satvar
 Dhoosar Kavita
 Kavita Chaturthi
 Lipi-Alipi
 Dheemee aanch me
 Anupasthit dinaank
 swapn, sampark, smriti [ edited book on Dr. Sitakant Mahapatra ]

See also
 List of Indian writers
 List of Indian poets

References

External links
 Parichay Das gets 'DWI-Vaageesh Samman

People from Mau district
Living people
Indian male essayists
Indian male poets
Poets from Uttar Pradesh
Year of birth missing (living people)
Bhojpuri-language writers